Krasny Oktyabr is a rural locality (a settlement) and the administrative center of Krasnooktyabrskoye Rural Settlement, Alexeyevsky District, Volgograd Oblast, Russia. The population was 895 as of 2010.

Geography 
The village is located 24 km north from Alexeyevskaya.

References 

Rural localities in Alexeyevsky District, Volgograd Oblast